Cecile Esmei Amari  (born 20 November 1991) is an Ivorian footballer who plays as a midfielder for the Ivory Coast women's national football team. She was part of the team at the 2014 African Women's Championship and 2015 FIFA Women's World Cup. On club level, she plays for Ataşehir Belediyespor with jersey number 7 in the 2019-20 Turkish Women's First Football League.

She played in Morocco in 2012 for Raja Haroda Casablanca. In 2013, she was with Wydad AC in the same country. She was loaned out to the Serbian team ZFK Spartak Subotica in 2014.

See also
List of Ivory Coast women's international footballers

References

External links
 CAF player profile

1991 births
Living people
Footballers from Abidjan
Ivorian women's footballers
Women's association football midfielders
Wydad AC players
ŽFK Spartak Subotica players
Ivory Coast women's international footballers
Ivorian expatriate footballers
Ivorian expatriate sportspeople in Morocco
Expatriate footballers in Morocco
Ivorian expatriate sportspeople in Serbia
Expatriate women's footballers in Serbia
Ivorian expatriate sportspeople in Turkey
Expatriate women's footballers in Turkey
Turkish Women's Football Super League players
Ataşehir Belediyespor players